Hafnium(IV) triflate or hafnium trifluoromethansulfonate is an inorganic substance with the idealized formula Hf(OSO2CF3)4, also written as Hf(OTf)4. Hafnium triflate is used as an impure mixture as a catalyst. Hafnium (IV) has an ionic radius of intermediate range (Al < Ti < Hf < Zr < Sc < Ln) and has an oxophilic hard character typical of group IV metals. This solid is a stronger Lewis acid than its typical precursor hafnium tetrachloride, HfCl4, because of the strong electron-withdrawing nature of the four triflate groups, which makes it a great Lewis acid and has many uses including as a great catalyst at low Lewis acid loadings for electrophilic aromatic substitution and nucleophilic substitution reactions.

Preparation 
The compound was first synthesized by the Kobayashi group in 1995 via the reaction of HfCl4 and triflic acid. This solid is air stable, easy to handle, and commercially available.

Uses

Electrophilic Substitutions 

Friedel-Craft acylation or alkylation reactions are some of the most important synthetic methodologies to introduce carbonyl or alkyl groups onto aromatic compounds. The first Hf(OTf)4 catalyzed Friedel-Crafts acylation was developed by Kobayashi et al. in 1995. The authors demonstrated that Friedel-Crafts acylation could be achieved in excellent yield between arenes and acid anhydrides when utilizing Hf(OTf)4 as a catalyst. Hf(OTf)4, was the most effective in comparison to other Lewis acids including BF3 • OEt2, Sc(OTf)3, and Zr(OTf)4. Similalrly, Hf(OTf)4 shows excellent activity in Friedel-Crafts alkylation’s, and enabled the alkylation of benzene with benzylic and tertiary alkyl chlorides.

Hf(OTf)4-catalyzed Friedel-Crafts alkylation has been utilized in the total synthesis of the altertoxin III framework. This approach provided a more efficient synthesis of the fused-ring structure compared to previous methods.

Hf(OTf)4, alongside Sc(OTf)3 and In(OTf)3, has been shown to activate alkynes and enable electrophilic substitution. In 2004 Song and Lee et al. reported Hf(OTf)4-catalyzed Friedel-Crafts alkenylation of benzene with alkenyl derivatives.

Nucleophilic Substitutions 
In 2008, Zhu et al. demonstrated that Hf(OTf)4 was an effective catalyst for the thioacetalization of aldehydes and ketones. In the absence of Lewis acid this reaction can occur in glycerol at 90 °C. Hf(OTf)4 accelerated the reaction rate under milder conditions with only 0.1 mol% catalyst loading. For example, Hf(OTf)4 catalyzes the reaction between benzaldehyde and 2.0 equiv. of either ethanethiol or 1.0 equiv. of propane-1,3,-dithiol readily in quantitative yield.

This methodology was utilized in the total synthesis of (-)-leucomidine B from an enantioenriched monoacid synthesized via a Hf(OTf)4 catalyzed thioacetalization.

In 2009, Nakamura et al. demonstrated that Hf(OTf)4 was uniquely able to catalyzed a Prins reaction between an aryl aldehyde and an O-protected/unprotected cyclohex-3-ene-1,2-dimethanol.

References 

Hafnium compounds
Triflates